Abbots Worthy is a small village in the City of Winchester district of Hampshire, England. It is in the civil parish of Kings Worthy.

Abbots Worthy is included within the civil parish of Kings Worthy and is part of the Winchester City Council administration.

In 1870–72, John Marius Wilson in the Imperial Gazetteer of England and Wales described Abbotts Worthy as:

ABBOTSWORTHY, a tything in the parish of Kings worthy, 2 miles NNE of Winchester, Hants.

The River Itchen lies just to the south of Abbots Worthy.

Notable former residents
 Archie Bland - Writer, journalist and Deputy Editor of The Independent newspaper
 Sir Christopher Bland - Former Chairman of British Telecom, the BBC and the RSC
 Lady Georgia Byng - Children's author
 The Hon. Jamie Byng - Owner of Canongate Books
 The 8th Earl of Strafford

References

External links

Villages in Hampshire